André Ricardo Bankoff (born July 20, 1978) is a Brazilian actor.

Biography 
André was born in Americana, São Paulo. He is of Bulgarian, Italian and Polish descent.

Career 

Participated in the miniseries Mad Maria and soap opera Bang Bang, both in Rede Globo. Bicho do Mato (2006), the Rede Record, played Juba, the protagonist. This was his first important role on television.

He worked as a model and did commercials for television. He studied theater and actors made the Workshop of Rede Globo for eight months. He joined the cast of Xuxa popstar in 2000 and also presented the program for some time Moto'n Roll, the channel subscription SporTV.

Before the fame, Andrew has pursued a career in football. He played in the Ponte Preta and had a brief stint at Associazione Sportiva Roma, Italy.

In 2007, he was cast in the soap opera Amor e Intrigas like Pedro, in his last role was André Campos in Record Poder Paralelo telenovela.

In 2011 played Tiago on the soap opera Morde & Assopra, this novel marked the return of Andre the Globo Television Network. Was confirmed in the cast of Saramandaia in 2013, in which she plays the mudancista Pedro.

Filmography

Television

Film

References

External links 

1978 births
Living people
People from Americana, São Paulo
Brazilian people of Bulgarian descent
Brazilian people of Italian descent
Brazilian people of Polish descent
Brazilian male television actors
Brazilian male telenovela actors
Brazilian male film actors
Brazilian male stage actors
Male actors from São Paulo (state)